Irina Zabludina (born 24 February 1987) is a Russian judoka. She competed in the Women's 57 kg event at the 2012 Summer Olympics, reaching the quarterfinals before losing to Marti Malloy.

References

External links
 
 

1987 births
Living people
Russian female judoka
Olympic judoka of Russia
Judoka at the 2012 Summer Olympics
Judoka at the 2016 Summer Olympics
Sportspeople from Krasnodar Krai
Universiade medalists in judo
Universiade bronze medalists for Russia
European Games competitors for Russia
Judoka at the 2015 European Games
Medalists at the 2013 Summer Universiade
21st-century Russian women